Lachlan Schultz (born 30 November 1997) is a professional Australian rules footballer who plays for the Fremantle Football Club in the Australian Football League (AFL).

Early career
Originally from Moama, Schultz played for the Bendigo Pioneers in the TAC Cup. He moved to Melbourne and played 37 games for Williamstown over the next two seasons.  He was drafted to Fremantle with the 57th selection in the 2018 national draft after being one of the better players in the Victorian Football League (VFL).

AFL career
Schultz made his AFL debut for Fremantle in the opening round of the 2019 AFL season. Schultz kicked the match winning goal for Fremantle against St Kilda in the 6th round of the 2020 AFL season.

At the end of 2021  contracted Schultz for two more seasons with an option for a third after Hawthorn was tabling a three year deal for him to move to Victoria. The Hawks would have been able to snare Schultz as a free agent if he did not come to terms with the Dockers, given he was delisted last year and re-listed as a rookie. 

Schultz played almost every game in 2022 kicking 30 goals in a career-best season. He was awarded the Glendinning-Allan Medal for his performance during the round three Western Derby, in which he collected 23 disposals and kicked two goals.

Statistics
Updated to the end of the 2022 season.

|-
| 2019 ||  || 28
| 7 || 4 || 3 || 46 || 36 || 82 || 15 || 17 ||  0.6 || 0.4 || 6.6 || 5.1 || 11.7 || 2.1 || 2.4 || 0
|-
| 2020 ||  || 28
| 17 || 12 || 7 || 109 || 60 || 169 || 61 || 43 ||  0.7 || 0.4 || 6.4 || 3.5 || 9.9 || 3.6 || 2.5 || 0
|-
| 2021 ||  || 28
| 20 || 22 || 17 || 148 || 72 || 220 || 80 || 54  || 1.1 || 0.9 || 7.4 || 3.6 || 11.0 || 4.0 || 2.7 || 0
|-
| 2022 ||  || 5
| 23 || 30 || 19 || 196 || 114 || 310 || 93 || 69 || 1.3 || 0.8 || 8.5 || 5.0 || 13.5 || 4.0 || 3.0 || 6
|- class=sortbottom
! colspan=3 | Career
! 67 !! 68 !! 46 !! 499 !! 282 !! 781 !! 249 !! 183 !! 1.0 !! 0.7 !! 7.4 !! 4.2 !! 11.7 !! 3.7 !! 2.7 !! 6
|}

Notes

Honours and achievements
Individual
 Glendinning–Allan Medal: 2022 (round 3)

References

External links

Williamstown profile

1997 births
Living people
Fremantle Football Club players
Williamstown Football Club players
Bendigo Pioneers players
Australian rules footballers from New South Wales
Peel Thunder Football Club players